The 1906 Louisiana Industrial football team was an American football team that represented the Louisiana Industrial Institute—now known as Louisiana Tech University—as an independent during the 1906 college football season. In their first and only season under head coach Zack T. Young, Louisiana Industrial compiled a record of 2–1–3. The team's captain was H. T. Hair.

Schedule

References

Louisiana Industrial
Louisiana Tech Bulldogs football seasons
Louisiana Industrial football